Twixt Love and Ambition is a 1912 silent film short produced by the Lubin Manufacturing Company and distributed by General Film Company.  It starred Edwin August and actress Ormi Hawley.

This film is preserved in the Library of Congress collection.

Cast
Edwin August - John Sterne
Ormi Hawley - Marie Wayne
Buster Johnson - Dan, John's Nephew and Ward
Jane Gail - Dan's Mother

References

External links

1912 short films
1912 films
American silent short films
American black-and-white films
Lubin Manufacturing Company films
American romantic drama films
1912 romantic drama films
1910s American films
Silent romantic drama films
Silent American drama films